Aulus Sempronius Atratinus was a consular tribune of the Roman Republic in 425, 420, 416 BC and possibly consul in 428 BC.

Sempronius belonged to the patrician branch of the Sempronia gens. He was the son of Lucius Sempronius Atratinus, consul in 444 BC and one of the first censors of the Republic. Gaius Sempronius Atratinus, consul in 423 BC and a contemporary relative was probably a cousin (son of Aulus Sempronius Atratinus) or a younger brother.

Career 
In 428 or 427 BC Sempronius held the consulship together with Lucius Quinctius Cincinnatus. This consulship is dubious as it is only mentioned by Diodorus Siculus and is placed in-between the consuls of 428, Aulus Cornelius Cossus and Titus Quinctius Poenus Cincinnatus, and the consuls of 427 BC, Gaius Servilius Structus Ahala and Lucius Papirius Mugillanus. 
It is possible that they were suffect consuls replacing the college of 428 BC or that all four consuls mentioned in 428 were consular tribunes. All events described by other ancient authors are ascribed to the ordinary consuls of 428 BC.

Sempronius would be elected as consular tribune in 425 BC together with (possibly his former consular colleague) Lucius Quinctius Cincinnatus, Lucius Furius Medullinus and Lucius Horatius Barbatus. They oversaw the signing of a twenty year long truce with Veii and a three year long truce with the Aequi.

Sempronius was re-elected as consular tribune in 420 BC, sharing it with two of his former colleagues, Furius and Quinctius, and a consular newcomer, Marcus Manlius Vulso. In some sources the Quinctius who shared in the college was not Lucius Quinctius, but instead his brother Titus Quinctius Poenus Cincinnatus. Little is known of the events during the year other than that Sempronius presided over the election of the Quaestors.

Sempronius would again hold the imperium as consular tribune, this in 416 BC. His colleagues were Marcus Papirius Mugillanus, Quintus Fabius Vibulanus and Spurius Nautius Rutilus. The only known event during the year was the proposal of a agrarian law by two of the Tribunes of the Plebs, which was vetoed by their own colleagues.

See also

References 

Roman consular tribunes
5th-century BC Romans
Atratinus, Aulus